Scranton is a city in the Commonwealth of Pennsylvania, United States, and the county seat of Lackawanna County.  With a population of 76,328 as of the 2020 U.S. census, Scranton is the largest city in Northeastern Pennsylvania and the Scranton–Wilkes-Barre–Hazleton Metropolitan Statistical Area, which has a population of 562,037 as of 2020. It is the sixth largest city in Pennsylvania. The contiguous network of five cities and more than 40 boroughs all built in a straight line in Northeastern Pennsylvania's urban area act culturally and logistically as one continuous city, so while the city of Scranton itself is a mid-sized city, the larger Scranton/Wilkes-Barre Metropolitan Area contains nearly half a million residents in roughly 200 square miles. Scranton is the cultural and economic center of a region called Northeastern Pennsylvania, which is home to over 1.3 million residents.

Scranton hosts a federal court building for the United States District Court for the Middle District of Pennsylvania. The city is conventionally divided into nine districts: North Scranton, Southside, Westside, Eastside/Hill Section, Central City, Minooka, West Mountain, East Mountain, and Green Ridge, though these areas do not have legal status. The city is the geographic and cultural center of the Lackawanna River valley (a local name for a small part of the Wyoming Valley) and Northeastern Pennsylvania, as well as the largest of the former anthracite coal mining communities in a contiguous quilt-work that also includes Wilkes-Barre, Nanticoke, Pittston, and Carbondale. Scranton was incorporated on February 14, 1856, as a borough in Luzerne County and as a city on April 23, 1866. It became a major industrial city and a center of mining and railroads; it attracted thousands of new immigrants. It was the site of the Scranton General Strike in 1877.

People in northern Luzerne County sought a new county in 1839, but the Wilkes-Barre area resisted losing its assets. Lackawanna County did not gain independent status until 1878. Under legislation allowing the issue to be voted by residents of the proposed territory, voters favored the new county by a proportion of 6 to 1, with Scranton residents providing the major support. The city was designated as the county seat when Lackawanna County was established in 1878, and a judicial district was authorized in July 1879.

The city's nickname "Electric City" began when electric lights were introduced in 1880 at the Dickson Manufacturing Company. Six years later, the United States' first streetcars powered only by electricity began operating in the city. Rev. David Spencer, a local Baptist minister, later proclaimed Scranton as the "Electric City".

The city's industrial production and population peaked in the 1930s and 1940s, fueled by demand for coal and textiles, especially during World War II. But while the national economy boomed after the war, demand for the region's coal declined as other forms of energy became more popular, which also harmed the rail industry. Foreseeing the decline, city leaders formulated the Scranton Plan in 1945 to diversify the local economy beyond coal, but the city's economy continued to decline. The Knox Mine disaster of 1959 essentially ended coal mining in the region. Scranton's population dropped from its peak of 143,433 in the 1930 census to 76,089 in the 2010 census. The city now has large health care, academic, and manufacturing sectors.

History

Pre-industrial (1776–1845)

Present-day Scranton and its surrounding area had been long inhabited by the native Lenape tribe, from whose language "Lackawanna" (or lac-a-wa-na, meaning "stream that forks") is derived. In 1778, Isaac Tripp, the area's first known white settler, built his home here; it still stands in North Scranton, formerly a separate town known as Providence. More settlers from Connecticut came to the area in the late 18th and early 19th centuries after the American Revolutionary War, as their state claimed this area as part of their colonial charter.

They gradually established mills and other small businesses in a village that became known as Slocum Hollow. People in the village during this time carried the traits and accent of their New England settlers, which were somewhat different from most of Pennsylvania. Some area settlers from Connecticut participated in what was known as the Pennamite Wars, where settlers competed for control of the territory which had been included in royal colonial land grants to both states. (This claim between Connecticut and Pennsylvania was settled by negotiation with the federal government after independence.)

Arrival of industry (1846–1899)

Though anthracite coal was being mined in Carbondale to the north and Wilkes-Barre to the south, the industries that precipitated the city's early rapid growth were iron and steel. In the 1840s, brothers Selden T. and George W. Scranton, who had worked at Oxford Furnace in Oxford, New Jersey, founded what became Lackawanna Iron & Coal, later developing as the Lackawanna Steel Company. It initially started producing iron nails, but that venture failed due to low-quality iron. The Erie Railroad's construction in New York State was delayed by its having to acquire iron rails as imports from England. The Scrantons' firm decided to switch its focus to producing T-rails for the Erie; the company soon became a major producer of rails for the rapidly expanding railroads.

In 1851, the Scrantons built the Lackawanna and Western Railroad (L&W) northward, with recent Irish immigrants supplying most of the labor, to meet the Erie Railroad in Great Bend, Pennsylvania. Thus they could transport manufactured rails from the Lackawanna Valley to New York and the Midwest. They also invested in coal mining operations in the city to fuel their steel operations, and to market it to businesses. In 1856, they expanded the railroad eastward as the Delaware, Lackawanna and Western Railroad (DL&W), in order to tap into the New York City metropolitan market. This railroad, with its hub in Scranton, was Scranton's largest employer for almost one hundred years.

The Pennsylvania Coal Company built a gravity railroad in the 1850s through the city for the purpose of transporting coal. The gravity railroad was replaced by a steam railroad built in 1886 by the Erie and Wyoming Valley Railroad (later absorbed by the Erie Railroad).  The Delaware and Hudson (D&H) Canal Company, which had its own gravity railroad from Carbondale to Honesdale, built a steam railroad that entered Scranton in 1863.

During this short period of time, the city rapidly transformed from a small, agrarian-based village of people with New England roots to a multicultural, industrial-based city. From 1860 to 1900, the city's population increased more than tenfold. Most new immigrants, such as the Irish, Italians, and south Germans and Polish, were Catholic, a contrast to the majority-Protestant early settlers of colonial descent. National, ethnic, religious and class differences were wrapped into political affiliations, with many new immigrants joining the Democratic Party (and, for a time in the late 1870s, the Greenbacker-Labor Party.)

In 1856, the Borough of Scranton was officially incorporated. It was incorporated as a city of 35,000 in 1866 in Luzerne County, when the surrounding boroughs of Hyde Park (now part of the city's West Side) and Providence (now part of North Scranton) were merged with Scranton. Twelve years later in 1878, the state passed a law enabling creation of new counties where a county's population surpassed 150,000, as did Luzerne's. The law appeared to enable the creation of Lackawanna County, and there was considerable political agitation around the authorizing process. Scranton was designated by the state legislature as the county seat of the newly formed county, which was also established as a separate judicial district, with state judges moving over from Luzerne County after courts were organized in October 1878. This was the last county in the state to be organized.

Creation of the new county, which enabled both more local control and political patronage, helped begin the Scranton General Strike of 1877. This was in part due to the larger Great Railroad Strike, in which railroad workers began to organize and participate in walkouts after wage cuts in Martinsburg, West Virginia. The national economy had lagged since the Panic of 1873, and workers in many industries struggled with low wages and intermittent work. In Scranton, mineworkers followed the railroad men off the job, as did others. A protest of 5,000 strikers ended in violence, with a total of four men killed, and 20 to 50 injured, including the mayor. He had established a militia, but called for help from the governor and state militia. Governor John Hartranft eventually brought in federal troops to quell the strike. The workers gained nothing in wages, but began to organize more purposefully into labor unions that could wield more power.

The nation's first successful, continuously operating electrified streetcar (trolley) system was established in the city in 1886, inspiring the nickname "The Electric City". In 1896, the city's various streetcar companies were consolidated into the Scranton Railway Company, which ran trolleys until 1954. By 1890, three other railroads had built lines to tap into the rich supply of coal in and around the city, including the Erie Railroad, the Central Railroad of New Jersey and finally the New York, Ontario and Western Railway (NYO&W).

As the vast rail network spread above ground, an even larger network of railways served the rapidly expanding system of coal veins underground. Miners, who in the early years were typically Welsh and Irish, were hired as cheaply as possible by the coal barons. The workers endured low pay, long hours and unsafe working conditions. Children as young as eight or nine worked 14-hour days separating slate from coal in the breakers. Often, the workers were forced to use company-provided housing and purchase food and other goods from stores owned by the coal companies. With hundreds of thousands of immigrants arriving in the industrial cities, mine owners did not have to search for labor and workers struggled to keep their positions. Later miners came from Italy and eastern Europe, which people fled because of poverty and lack of jobs.

Business was booming at the end of the 19th century. The tonnage of coal mined increased virtually every year, as did the steel manufactured by the Lackawanna Steel Company. At one point the company had the largest steel plant in the United States, and it was still the second largest producer at the turn of the 20th century. By 1900, the city had a population of more than 100,000.

In the late 1890s, Scranton was home to a series of early International League baseball teams.

Labor history
Given its industrial basis, Scranton has had a notable labor history; various coal worker unions struggled throughout the coal-mining era to improve working conditions, raise wages, and guarantee fair treatment for workers.  The Panic of 1873 and other economic difficulties caused a national recession and loss of business. As the economy contracted, the railroad companies reduced wages of workers in most classes (while sometimes reserving raises for their top management). A major strike of railroad workers in August 1877, part of the Great Railroad Strike, attracted workers from the steel industry and mining as well, and developed as the Scranton General Strike. Four rioters were killed during unrest during the strike, after the mayor mustered a militia. With violence suppressed by militia and federal troops, workers finally returned to their jobs, not able to gain any economic relief. William Walker Scranton, from the prominent family, was then general manager of Lackawanna Iron and Coal. He later founded Scranton Steel Company.

The labor issues and growth of industry in Scranton contributed to Lackawanna County being established by the state legislature in 1878, with territory taken from Luzerne County. Scranton was designated as the county seat. This strengthened its local government.

The unions failed to gain higher wages that year, but in 1878 they elected labor leader Terence V. Powderly of the Knights of Labor as mayor of Scranton. After that, he became national leader of the KoL, a predominately Catholic organization that had a peak membership of 700,000 circa 1880. While the Catholic Church had prohibited membership in secret organizations since the mid-18th century, by the late 1880s with the influence of Archbishop James Gibbons of Baltimore, Maryland, it supported the Knights of Labor as representing workingmen and union organizing.

The landmark Coal strike of 1902 was called by anthracite miners across the region and led by the United Mine Workers under John Mitchell. The strike was settled by a compromise brokered by President Theodore Roosevelt. A statue of John Mitchell was installed in his honor on the grounds of the Lackawanna County Courthouse in Scranton, "the site of the Coal Strike of 1902 negotiations in which President Roosevelt participated. Because of the significance of these negotiations, the statue and the Courthouse were added to the National Register of Historic Places in 1997. John Mitchell is buried in Cathedral Cemetery in Scranton."

Growth, prosperity and consequences (1900–1945)

By the United States Census of 1900, the population of Scranton was about 102,026, making it the third largest city in Pennsylvania and 38th largest U.S. city.
At the turn of the 20th century, wealthy businessmen and industrialists built impressive Victorian mansions in the Hill and Green Ridge sections of the city. Most were descended from colonists and belonged to the Republican Party. The industrial workers, who tended to be later immigrants from Ireland and southern and eastern Europe, were predominately Catholic. With a flood of immigrants in the market, they suffered poor working conditions and wages.

In 1902, the dwindling local iron ore supply, labor issues, and an aging plant cost the city the industry on which it was founded. The Lackawanna Steel Company and many of its workers were moved to Lackawanna, New York, developed on Lake Erie just south of Buffalo. With a port on the lake, the company could receive iron ore shipped from the Mesabi Range in Minnesota, which was being newly mined.

Scranton forged ahead as the capital of the anthracite coal industry. Attracting the thousands of workers needed to mine coal, the city developed new neighborhoods dominated by Italian and Eastern European immigrants, who brought their foods, cultures and religions. Many of the immigrants joined the Democratic Party. Their national churches and neighborhoods were part of the history of the city. Several Catholic and Orthodox churches were founded and built during this period. A substantial Jewish community was also established, with most members coming from the Russian Empire and eastern Europe. Working conditions for miners were improved by the efforts of labor leaders such as John Mitchell, who led the United Mine Workers.

The sub-surface mining weakened whole neighborhoods, however, damaging homes, schools, and businesses when the land collapsed. In 1913 the state passed the Davis Act to establish the Bureau of Surface Support in Scranton. Because of the difficulty in dealing with the coal companies, citizens organized the Scranton Surface Protection Association, chartered by the Court of Common Pleas on November 24, 1913 "to protect the lives and property of the citizens of the City of Scranton and the streets of said city from injury, loss and damage caused by mining and mine caves."

In 1915 and 1917, the city and Commonwealth sought injunctions to prevent coal companies from undermining city streets but lost their cases. North Main Avenue and Boulevard Avenue, "both entitled to surface support, caved in as a result" of court decisions that went against civil authorities and allowed the coal companies to continue their operations.

"The case of Penman v. Jones came out differently. The Lackawanna Iron & Coal Co. had leased coal lands to the Lackawanna Iron & Steel Co., an allied interest, which passed the leases on to the Scranton Coal Co. Areas of central Scranton, the Hill Section, South Side, Pine Brook, Green Ridge and Hyde Park were affected by their mining activities. Mr. Penman was the private property owner in the case. The coal operators were defeated in this case."

The public transportation system began to expand beyond the trolley lines pioneered by predecessors of the Scranton Railways system. The Lackawanna and Wyoming Valley Railroad, commonly referred to as the Laurel Line, was built as an interurban passenger and freight carrier to Wilkes-Barre. Its Scranton station, offices, powerhouse and maintenance facility were built on the former grounds of the Lackawanna Steel Company, and operations started in 1903. Beginning in 1907, Scrantonians could also ride trolley cars to the northern suburbs of Clarks Summit and Dalton. They could travel to Lake Winola and Montrose using the Northern Electric Railroad. After the 1920s, no new trolley lines were built, but bus operations were started and expanded to meet service needs. In 1934, Scranton Railways was re-incorporated as the Scranton Transit Company, reflecting that shift in transportation modes.

Starting in the early 1920s, the Scranton Button Company (founded in 1885 and a major maker of shellac buttons) became one of the primary makers of phonograph records. They pressed records for Emerson (whom they bought in 1924), as well as Regal, Cameo, Romeo, Banner, Domino, Conqueror. In July 1929, the company merged with Regal, Cameo, Banner, and the U.S. branch of Pathé (makers of Pathé and Perfect) to become the American Record Corporation. By 1938, the Scranton company was also pressing records for Brunswick, Melotone, and Vocalion. In 1946, the company was acquired by Capitol Records, which continued to produce phonograph records through the end of the vinyl era.

By the mid-1930s, the city population had swelled beyond 140,000 due to growth in the mining and silk textile industries. World War II created a great demand for energy, which led to the highest production from mining in the area since World War I.

Post–World War II (1946–1984)

After World War II, coal lost favor to oil and natural gas as a heating fuel, largely because the latter types were more convenient to use. While some U.S. cities prospered in the post-war boom, the fortunes and population of Scranton (and the rest of Lackawanna and Luzerne counties) began to diminish. Coal production and rail traffic declined rapidly throughout the 1950s, causing a loss of jobs.

In 1954, Worthington Scranton and his wife, Marion Margery Scranton, contributed one million dollars to establish the Scranton Foundation (now the Scranton Area Community Foundation), which was launched to support charitable and educational organizations in the city of Scranton.

The Knox Mine Disaster of January 1959 virtually ended the mining industry in Northeastern Pennsylvania. The waters of the Susquehanna River flooded the mines. The DL&W Railroad, nearly bankrupted by the drop in coal traffic and the effects of Hurricane Diane, merged in 1960 with the Erie Railroad.
Demand for public transportation also declined as new highways were built by federal subsidies and people purchased automobiles. In 1952, the Laurel Line ceased passenger service. The Scranton Transit Company, whose trolleys had given the city its nickname, transferred all operations to buses as the 1954 holiday season approached; by the end of 1971, it ceased all operations. The city was left without any public transportation system for almost a year until the Lackawanna County government formed COLTS, which began operations in late 1972 with 1950s-era GM busses from New Jersey.

Scranton had been the hub of its operations until the Erie Lackawanna merger, after which it no longer served in this capacity. This was another severe blow to the local labor market. The NYO&W Railroad, which depended heavily on its Scranton branch for freight traffic, was abandoned in 1957. Mine subsidence was a spreading problem in the city as pillar supports in abandoned mines began to fail; cave-ins sometimes consumed entire blocks of homes. The area was left scarred by abandoned coal mining structures, strip mines, and massive culm dumps, some of which caught fire and burned for many years until they were extinguished through government efforts. In 1970, the Secretary of Mines for Pennsylvania suggested that so many underground voids had been left by mining underneath Scranton that it would be "more economical" to abandon the city than make them safe. In 1973, the last mine operations in Lackawanna County (which were in what is now McDade Park, and another on the Scranton/Dickson City line) were closed. During the 1960s and 1970s, the silk and other textile industries shrank as jobs were moved to the South or overseas.

In 1962, businessman Alex Grass opened his first "Thrif D Discount Center" drugstore on Lackawanna Avenue in downtown Scranton. The  store, an immediate success, was the progenitor of the Rite Aid national drugstore chain.

During the 1970s and 1980s, many downtown storefronts and theaters became vacant. Suburban development followed the highways and suburban shopping malls became the dominant venues for shopping and entertainment.

Stabilization and restoration (1985–present)

Since the mid-1980s, the city has emphasized revitalization. Local government and much of the community at large have adopted a renewed interest in the city's buildings and history. Some historic properties have been renovated and marketed as tourist attractions. The Steamtown National Historic Site captures the area's once-prominent position in the railroad industry. The former DL&W train station was restored as the Radisson Lackawanna Station Hotel. The Electric City Trolley Museum was created next to the DL&W yards that the Steamtown NHS occupies.

Since the mid-1980s the Scranton Cultural Center has operated the architecturally significant Masonic Temple and Scottish Rite Cathedral, designed by Raymond Hood, as the region's performing arts center. The Houdini Museum was opened in Scranton in 1990 by nationally known magician Dorothy Dietrich.

In 2003, Hilton Hotels & Resorts opened the Hilton Scranton Hotel & Conference Center at the corner of Adams Avenue & Lackawanna Avenue in the heart of downtown Scranton. Due to the rage for paranormal-themed televisions shows, a popular downtown historic Scranton Ghost Walk has been expanded to operate 365 days a year. Other attractions include the Montage Mountain ski resort (formerly Snö Mountain), the Wilkes-Barre/Scranton Penguins, AHL affiliate of the Pittsburgh Penguins; the Scranton/Wilkes-Barre RailRiders (formerly the Scranton/Wilkes Barre Yankees and, before that, the Scranton/Wilkes-Barre Red Barons), AAA affiliate of the New York Yankees; and their PNC Field, and the Toyota Pavilion at Montage Mountain concert venue.

According to The Guardian, the city was close to bankruptcy in July 2012, with the wages of all municipal officials, including the mayor and fire chief, being cut to $7.25/hour. Financial consultant Gary Lewis, who lives in Scranton, was quoted as estimating that "on 5 July the city had just $5,000 cash in hand."

Since the revitalization began, many coffee shops, restaurants, and bars have opened in the downtown, creating a vibrant night-life. The low cost of living, pedestrian-friendly downtown, and the construction of loft-style apartments in older, architecturally significant buildings have attracted young professionals and artists. Many are individuals who grew up in Scranton, moved to big cities after high school and college, and decided to return to the area to take advantage of its amenities. Many buildings around the city that were once empty are currently being restored. Many of the restored buildings will be used to entice new business into the city. Some of the newly renovated buildings are already being used.

Geography
Scranton is drained by the Lackawanna River.

Climate
Scranton has a humid continental climate (Köppen Dfa), with four distinct seasons. Summers have occasional heat waves bringing temperatures well above , while winters can have cold snaps bringing temperatures below . Precipitation is generally slightly greater during late spring and summer, while winter is generally the driest. Snowfall is variable, with some winters bringing light snow and others bringing numerous snowstorms.

Demographics

As of the 2020 census, there were 76,328 people and 31,039 households residing in the city. The racial makeup of the city was 83.1% White, 5.9% African American, 0.1% Native American, 4.7% Asian, 0.1% Pacific Islander, 4.4% from two or more races. Hispanic or Latino of any race make up 14.8% of the population.

As of the 2010 census, there were 76,089 people, 30,069 households, and 18,124 families residing in the city. The population density was 3,006/mi2 (1,161/km2). There were 33,853 housing units at an average density of 1,342/mi2 (518/km2). The racial makeup of the city was 84.11% White, 5.45% African American, 0.23% Native American, 2.98% Asian, 0.04% Pacific Islander, 4.69% from other races, and 2.49% from two or more races. Hispanic or Latino of any race make up 9.90% of the population. The largest ancestry in the city is Irish, making up 26.5% of the population.

There were 30,069 households, out of which 24.4% had children under the age of 18 living with them, 39.8% were married couples living together, 13.8% had a female householder with no husband present, and 42.1% were non-families. The city had 36.7% of its households with single occupancy and 18.1% whose individuals was aged at least 65. The average household size was 2.29 and the average family size was 3.01.

The age distribution of the population included 20.8% under 18, 12.3% from 18 to 24, 25.5% from 25 to 44, 21.2% from 45 to 64, and 20.1% at least 65. The median age was 39. For every 100 females, there were 87.0 males. For every 100 females aged at least 18, there were 83.0 males.

The median income for a household in the city was $28,805, and the median income for a family was $41,642. Males had a median income of $30,829 versus $21,858 for females. The per capita income for the city was $16,174. Found below the poverty line are 15.0% of the population, 10.7% of families, 18.9% of those under age 18 and 12.0% of those at least age 65.

As of the 2006 American Community Survey, the average family size is 2.95. Of the population that's 25 years old and over, 83.3% of them have graduated from high school. 18.7% of them have a Bachelor's degree or higher. In labor force (population 16 years and over), 57.6% of them work. The per capita income (in 2006 inflation-adjusted dollars) is $17,187.

Arts and culture

Landmarks and attractions

Many of Scranton's attractions celebrate its heritage as an industrial center in iron and coal production and its ethnic diversity. The Scranton Iron Furnaces are remnants of the city's founding industry and of the Scranton family's Lackawanna Steel Company. The Steamtown National Historic Site seeks to preserve the history of railroads in the Northeast. The Electric City Trolley Museum preserves and operates pieces of Pennsylvania streetcar history. Tourists may go for trolley rides from Downtown Scranton to PNC Field on Montage Mountain. The Lackawanna Coal Mine tour at McDade Park, conducted inside a former mine, describes the history of mining and railroads in the Scranton area. The former DL&W Passenger Station is now the Radisson Lackawanna Station Hotel.

Museums in Scranton include the Everhart Museum in Nay Aug Park, which houses a collection of natural history, science and art exhibits; and the Houdini Museum, which features films, exhibits, and a stage show in a unique, century-old building. Terence Powderly's house, still a private dwelling, is one of the city's many historic buildings and, with Steamtown, the city's other National Historic Landmark. In addition, The Lackawanna Historical Society, founded in 1886 and located at the George H. Catlin House in Scranton's Hill Section,  focuses on the history of Lackawanna County. Tripp House, built by the Tripp family in 1771, is the oldest building in the city.

The city's religious history is evident in the Basilica of the National Shrine of St. Ann, which draws thousands of pilgrims to its annual novena, and St. Stanislaus Cathedral, the seat of the Polish National Catholic Church in North America. The history of the founding of this denomination is tied to Polish immigration to Scranton in the late 19th century.

Since the 1970s, Scranton has hosted La Festa Italiana, a three-day Italian festival that takes place on Labor Day weekend on the courthouse square. The festival originally took place around Columbus Day, but was moved because Scranton generally receives cold weather in October.

Scranton's large Irish population is represented in the annual Saint Patrick's Day Parade, first held in 1862. Organized by the St. Patrick's Day Parade Association of Lackawanna County, it is the nation's fourth largest in attendance and second largest in per capita attendance. Held on the Saturday before Saint Patrick's Day, the parade includes more than 8,000 people, including floats, bagpipe players, high school bands and Irish groups. In 2008, attendance estimates were as high as 150,000 people.

For recreation, there is Montage Mountain Ski Resort, known as Sno Mountain for a short period, which rivals the numerous resorts of the Poconos in popularity and offers a relatively comprehensive range of difficulty levels. The  Steamtown Marathon has been held each October since 1996 and finishes in downtown Scranton. Nay Aug park is the largest of several parks in Scranton and was designed by Frederick Law Olmsted, who also laid out Central Park in Manhattan, New York City. The city is the home to numerous artistic organizations, including the Scranton Fringe Festival (a performing arts festival held in the downtown section of the city in fall).

Scranton's primary concert venue is the Toyota Pavilion at Montage Mountain, a partially covered amphitheater that seats 17,500. Its summer concerts have included James Taylor, Dave Matthews Band, and many other musical acts.

Scranton Cultural Center at the Masonic Temple is an impressive piece of architecture which houses several auditoriums and a large ballroom. It hosts the Northeast Philharmonic, Broadway Theater and other touring performances.

The tallest building in Scranton is the Scranton Times Tower, a lattice radio tower on the Times building, which is illuminated during Christmas season.

Libraries
The Lackawanna County Library System administers the libraries in Scranton, including the Albright Memorial Library, the Lackawanna County Children's Library and the Nancy Kay Holmes Library. As of 2008, Scranton libraries serve more than 96,000 people and have a circulation of over 547,000.

Sports
Scranton's professional sports date to 1887, when the minor-league Scranton Indians became the city's first professional baseball team. Many more followed, including teams in the Pennsylvania State League, Eastern League, Atlantic League, New York State League, New York–Penn League and the New York–Pennsylvania League. The Scranton/Wilkes-Barre RailRiders of the International League play their home games at PNC Field in Moosic, south of Scranton.

In football, the Scranton Eagles, a discontinued semi-pro/minor league team, dominated their Empire Football League, winning 11 championships. The former arena football Wilkes-Barre/Scranton Pioneers, who played eight seasons at the Mohegan Sun Arena, formerly Wachovia Arena, in Wilkes-Barre Township made the playoffs in their last six years of existence and contended for the ArenaCup VIII in 2007 and the ArenaCup X in 2009, their final year, but lost both times. Another semi-pro/minor league team the North East Pennsylvania Miners of the [Big North East Football Federation started play in the area in 2007.
The NEPA Shock are a Semi-Pro/Minor League team that currently operate out of the Dickson City borough. The Shock were established in 2012 and participate in arena style football as a member of the Great Eastern Football Association.

Scranton previously had pro basketball teams, including the Scranton Apollos, Scranton Miners and Scranton Zappers. Syracuse University men's basketball coach Jim Boeheim played for the Miners before turning to coaching.  In 2012, the city played host to the Scranton/Wilkes-Barre Steamers of the Premier Basketball League. The team went inactive after that season, and no professional teams played in the city. In 2018, the Scranton Shamrocks joined the American Basketball Association (2000–present), once again bringing professional basketball to the region.

Professional ice hockey arrived in 1999 when the Wilkes-Barre/Scranton Penguins of the American Hockey League began play at Mohegan Sun Arena at Casey Plaza in Wilkes-Barre Township. The team won conference championships in 2001, 2004, and 2008.

The Electric City Shock SC semi-professional soccer team was founded in 2013 as part of the National Premier Soccer League. The team is on the fourth tier of the American Soccer Pyramid and plays at the University of Scranton's Fitzpatrick Field.

Watres Armory in Scranton hosted a World Heavyweight Championship fight between titlist Larry Holmes and challenger Lucien Rodrigues of France on March 27, 1983. Holmes retained his title via a unanimous 12-round decision without losing a single round in any official scorecard.

Starting in 2014, Scranton also became home to the Skyliners Drum and Bugle Corps, a professional marching drum corps in the Drum Corps Associates circuit. They compete with other corps throughout the nation, as well as play multiple community parades, events and performances. The Skyliners have won numerous awards for their performances, including national and world open titles.

Education

Primary and secondary education
The city's public schools are operated by the Scranton School District (SSD), which serves almost 10,000 students. The city has two public high schools for grades 9–12: Scranton High School just northwest of the downtown and West Scranton High School located on the West Side of the city. The district also has three public middle schools for grades 6–8: Northeast Intermediate, South Scranton Intermediate, and West Scranton Intermediate. In addition, SSD maintains 12 public elementary schools for grades K–5.

Scranton has two private high schools: Scranton Preparatory School, a private Jesuit school, and Yeshiva Bais Moshe, an Ultra Orthodox school. Holy Cross High School in Dunmore is a Catholic high school operated by the Diocese of Scranton that serves students in Scranton and the surrounding area. The diocese also operates several private elementary schools in the city. Protestant schools that serve the Scranton area include Abington Christian Academy, Canaan Christian Academy, The Geneva School, Summit Academy, and Triboro Christian Academy. The Pennsylvania Department of Education provides oversight for the Scranton School for Deaf and Hard-of-Hearing Children. The Scranton State School for the Deaf, a state-run school was replaced by the Scranton School for Deaf and Hard-of-Hearing Children.

Penn Foster High School, a distance education high school, is headquartered in Scranton. Merakey Education Center is a small private school located in North Scranton.

Scranton, West Scranton, Scranton Prep and Holy Cross all compete athletically in Pennsylvania's Lackawanna League which is a part of District 2 of the Pennsylvania Interscholastic Athletic Association.

Colleges and universities
The city hosts five colleges and universities: The University of Scranton, Geisinger Commonwealth School of Medicine, Johnson College, Lackawanna College, Marywood University, and two technical schools, Fortis Institute and The Career Technology Center of Lackawanna County. The Pennsylvania State University operates a Commonwealth Campus, Penn State Scranton, north of the city, in the borough of Dunmore. LCCC, a community college operating out of Nanticoke in Luzerne County, operates a satellite campus at The Marketplace at Steamtown. Penn Foster Career School, a distance education vocational school, is headquartered in Scranton.

Media
The Scranton/Wilkes-Barre area is the 55th largest U.S. television market. Local television stations include:
 WNEP-TV ABC affiliate
 WBRE-TV NBC affiliate
 WYOU-TV CBS affiliate
 WVIA-TV PBS affiliate
 WOLF-TV FOX affiliate
 WQMY MyNetworkTV affiliate
 WSWB CW affiliate
 WQPX Ion Television affiliate

Local public-access television and government-access television (ECTV) programming is aired on Comcast cable TV channels 19 and 21.

Scranton hosts the headquarters of Times-Shamrock Communications, which publishes the city's major newspaper, The Times-Tribune, a Pulitzer Prize-winning broadsheet daily founded in 1870. Times-Shamrock also publishes the Electric City, a weekly entertainment tabloid, and The Citizens' Voice, a daily tabloid based in Wilkes-Barre. Times Leader is a daily paper that primarily covers nearby Wilkes-Barre. The Times Leader also publishes Go Lackawanna, a Sunday newspaper serving Scranton and surrounding municipalities, and the Weekender is a Wilkes-Barre-based entertainment tabloid with distribution in Scranton.

The Aquinas is the weekly student newspaper of the University of Scranton. The Scranton Post is a weekly general interest broadsheet which bills itself as the city's first online newspaper. There are several other print publications with a more narrow focus, including the Union News, La Voz Latina, and Melanian News.

The Scranton/Wilkes-Barre radio market is ranked #71 in the country by Arbitron.

Infrastructure

Transportation
The main highways that serve Scranton are Interstate 81, which runs North to Binghamton, New York and Ontario and south to Wilkes-Barre, Harrisburg and Tennessee; Interstate 84, which runs east to Milford and New England States; Interstate 380, which runs southeast to Pocono Pines and Interstate 80 east to New York City and west to San Francisco; Interstate 476/Pennsylvania Turnpike Northeast Extension, which runs south to Allentown and Philadelphia; U.S. Route 6, which runs east to Carbondale/Honesdale and parallel to I-84 to New England States and west to Erie; and U.S. Route 11, which runs parallel to I-81.

Scranton's provider of public transportation is the County of Lackawanna Transit System (COLTS). COLTS buses provide extensive service within the city and more limited service that reaches in all directions to Carbondale, Daleville, Pittston, and Fleetville. The other bussing company is the Luzerne County Transportation Authority (LCTA), which mainly runs through The Minooka section (closest to Luzerne County) and Downtown Scranton by The Mall at Steamtown. LCTA takes passengers from Scranton to the Mohegan Pennsylvania racino in Plains

The Wilkes-Barre/Scranton International Airport is located in nearby Avoca. The airport is serviced by American Airlines, Regional Sky and United.

Martz Trailways and Greyhound Lines provide coach bus transportation from its downtown station to New York City, Philadelphia and other places in the Northeast.

Private operators such as Burgit's Electric City Taxi service the Scranton area. They are hired by telephone through central dispatch and cannot be hailed on the street as in larger cities.

Railroads
Rail transportation, in both freight and passenger, were vital to the city's historic growth. The city was a hub, serving the Central Railroad of New Jersey (CNJ), the Delaware and Hudson Railway, the Delaware, Lackawanna and Western Railroad (DLW), the Erie Railroad, and the Lackawanna and Wyoming Valley Railroad (LWV), with routes radiating in all directions, to New York State's Southern Tier, to several points in Pennsylvania, and to parts in northern New Jersey. The CNJ station and the DLW station were the last to lose passenger service, in the early 1950s and in 1970, respectively.

Freight rail remains important and vital even today in Scranton.

The Norfolk Southern Railway runs freight trains on the former Delaware, Lackawanna & Western (DL&W) line between Scranton and Binghamton, having taken over operations from the Canadian Pacific Railway (Delaware and Hudson Railway division) in 2015. The Reading Blue Mountain & Northern Railroad serves the former DL&W Keyser Valley branch in the city.

The Delaware-Lackawanna Railroad, as designated operator of county-owned rail lines, oversees the former Delaware and Hudson line from Scranton north to Carbondale, the former DL&W line east to the Delaware Water Gap and the former Lackawanna and Wyoming Valley Railroad third-rail interurban streetcar line south to Montage Mountain, Moosic and the Minooka Industrial Track. These lines host the seasonal passenger trains of both the Steamtown National Historic Site and the Electric City Trolley Museum and are under the jurisdiction of the Pennsylvania Northeast Regional Railroad Authority.

The PNRRA was created by Lackawanna County and Monroe County to oversee the use of common rail freight lines in Northeastern Pennsylvania, including one formerly owned by Conrail running from Scranton, through the Pocono Mountains towards New Jersey and the New York City market.

One of its primary objectives is to re-establish rail passenger service to Hoboken, New Jersey and thence by connection to New York.
Indeed, regular passenger train service to Scranton is slated to be restored under a plan to extend NJ Transit service from Hoboken via the Lackawanna Cut-Off.  That project is ongoing as rail is being laid down in New Jersey. The trains would pass the Lackawanna Station building and pull in at a new Scranton station on Lackawanna Avenue along the northernmost track east of Bridge 60 (the railroad bridge over the Lackawanna River) and the Cliff Street underpass.

Fire department 
The Bureau of Fire was incorporated as a paid service in 1901. It is a full-time service consisting of about 142 firefighters. Its headquarters is on Mulberry Street in Central City. The fire department has seven operating fire stations. It has nine firefighting vehicles, including five engines, two trucks (ladders), one rescue, and an assistant chief's vehicle.

Police
Police headquarters is located on North Washington Avenue in downtown Scranton. Special Units include Arson Investigations, Auto Theft Task Force, Child Abuse Investigation, Crime Scene Investigation, Criminal Investigation, Juvenile Unit, Special Investigations Unit, Special Operations Group (SWAT/SOG), Canine Unit, Community Development and Highway Unit. The Police department has recently opened two new satellite stations.  The Highway Unit was relocated to one new station at N. Keyser Ave & Morgan Highway.  The second was opened at the Valley View Housing complex. There are plans for at least one more, and possibly two.

Notable people

Arts
 
 J. Grubb Alexander, silent film screenwriter
 Pete Barbutti, actor
 Walter Bobbie, theatre director and choreographer
 Alan Brown, filmmaker
 Sonny Burke, big band leader
 Mark Cohen, photographer
 Karl R. Coolidge, screenwriter
 Ann Crowley, singer and actress
 Emile de Antonio, documentary film director and producer
 Carrie De Mar, actress, singer, and vaudevillian
 Dorothy Dietrich, stage magician, escapologist, co-owner of Houdini Museum
 Margot Douaihy, writer and author
 Cy Endfield, screenwriter, film and theater director, author, magician, and inventor
 Ann Evers, film actress
 Wanda Hawley, silent film actress
 Allan Jones, singer and actor
 Jane Jacobs, writer and activist 
 Gloria Jean, singer and actress
 Stephen Karam, playwright and screenwriter
 JP Karliak, actor, voice actor, and comedian
 Jean Kerr, author and playwright
 Michael Patrick King, television and film writer, director and producer, co-creator of 2 Broke Girls and The Comeback
 William Kotzwinkle, novelist and screenwriter
 Michael Kuchwara, theater critic, columnist, and journalist
 Gershon Legman, cultural critic and folklorist
 Bradford Louryk, theater artist and actor
 Charles Emmett Mack, actor
 Jeanne Madden, singer, star of musical theater and 1930s films
 Carl Marzani, political activist, volunteer soldier in Spanish Civil War, organizer for the Communist Party USA, U.S. intelligence official, documentary filmmaker, author, and publisher
 Judy McGrath, MTV Networks CEO
 Charles MacArthur, playwright and screenwriter
 The Menzingers, punk band
 W. S. Merwin, 17th U.S. Poet Laureate
 Jason Miller, actor, director, and Pulitzer Prize–winning playwright of That Championship Season
 Russ Morgan, big band-era bandleader
 Motionless in White, gothic metalcore band
 Bruce Mozert, photographer
 Jay Parini, writer and academic
 Jerry Penacoli, actor and director
 Byrne Piven, stage actor
 Cynthia Rothrock, martial artist and star of martial arts films
 Lizabeth Scott, actress and singer
 Katy Selverstone, actress, Lisa Robbins on The Drew Carey Show
 Melanie Smith, television actress
 Thomas L. Thomas, concert singer
 Tigers Jaw, indie rock, emo band
 Beverly Tyler, actress and singer
 Sally Victor, milliner
 Ned Washington, Academy Award-winning lyricist
 Lauren Weisberger, author, The Devil Wears Prada

Government

 Joe Biden, 46th President of the United States (2021–), 47th Vice President of the United States, U.S. senator from Delaware (1973–2009)
 John Blake, former Pennsylvania State Senator
 Marion Cowan Burrows, former Massachusetts state legislator 
 Frank Carlucci, former U.S. Secretary of Defense and ambassador to Portugal
 Robert P. Casey, former governor of Pennsylvania
 Robert P. Casey Jr., U.S. senator
 Gaynor Cawley, former Pennsylvania State Representative 
 John Cusick, retired lieutenant general and 42nd Quartermaster General of the United States Army
 David J. Davis, former Pennsylvania lieutenant governor
 Mike Dunleavy, governor of Alaska
 Hugh E. Rodham, father of Hillary Clinton
 Hermann Eilts, former U.S. ambassador to Saudi Arabia, Egypt, and Bangladesh
 John R. Farr, U.S. Congresman
 Kathleen Kane, former Pennsylvania attorney general and felon
 Terence V. Powderly, former head of Knights of Labor
 Robert Reich, professor and political commentator, former U.S. Secretary of Labor
 Mary Scranton, former First Lady of Pennsylvania
 William Scranton, former governor of Pennsylvania and U.S. ambassador to the United Nations
 William Scranton III, former Pennsylvania lieutenant governor 
 Joel Wachs, Los Angeles city council member
 John Anthony Walker, former U.S. Navy chief warrant officer convicted of spying for the Soviet Union
 Laurence Hawley Watres. U.S. Congressman 
 Louis A. Watres, Pennsylvania lieutenant governor

Sports

 Hank Bullough, NFL player and coach
 P. J. Carlesimo, college, Olympic, and professional basketball coach and television broadcaster
 Jimmy Caras , professional pool player
 Nick Chickillo, former NFL player
 Nestor Chylak, Baseball Hall of Famer and former American League umpire 
 Joe Collins, Major League Baseball player, six-time World Series champion 
 Patty Costello, professional bowler, International Bowling Congress Hall of Fame, and Pro Bowlers Tour Hall of Fame member
 Jim Crowley, football player and coach, one-fourth of University of Notre Dame's legendary "Four Horsemen" backfield
 Paul Foytack, Major League Baseball pitcher
 Charlie Gelbert, Major League Baseball player
 Joe Grzenda, Major League Baseball player
 Cosmo Iacavazzi, college and AFL player
 Edgar Jones, college and professional football player
 Gary Lavelle, Major League Baseball player
 Bill Lazor, NFL offensive coordinator 
 Dave Lettieri, Olympic cyclist
 Ralph Lomma, popularized miniature golf
 Mike Lynn, general manager and executive Minnesota Vikings
 Joe McCarthy, Major League Baseball player
 Matt McGloin, former NFL quarterback
 Gerry McNamara, assistant coach, Syracuse Orange
 Mike McNally, former Major League Baseball player, member of New York Yankees first World Series championship team 
 Mike Munchak, former head coach of NFL's Tennessee Titans, college and NFL player, member of Pro Football Hall of Fame
 Joe O'Malley, football player
 Jim O'Neill, Major League Baseball player
 Steve O'Neill, former Major League Baseball player and manager
 Jackie Paterson, Scottish boxer
 Jim Rempe, pocket billiards champion and member of the Billiard Congress of America Hall of Fame
 Adam Rippon, figure skater
 Tim Ruddy, college and National Football League player
 Dutch Savage, professional wrestler
 Greg Sherman, general manager of NHL's Colorado Avalanche
 Chick Shorten, Major League Baseball player
 Marc Spindler, college and NFL player
 Brian Stann, mixed martial artist, UFC analyst for Fox Sports, former WEC Light Heavyweight champion

Others

 Joseph Bambera, Bishop of Scranton
 Mamie Cadden, Irish midwife and murderer
 Lisa Caputo, Citigroup group
 Howard Gardner, developmental psychologist and professor
 Frank Gibney, journalist and scholar
 Hugh Glass, American frontiersman
 Alex Grass, founder of Rite Aid
 Lansing C. Holden, architect 
 Jeffrey Bruce Klein, investigative journalist, co-founded Mother Jones magazine
 Gino J. Merli, Medal of Honor recipient during World War II
 John Mitchell, labor organizer, founding member and president, United Mine Workers of America
 Robert C. Morlino, Bishop of Madison, Wisconsin
 John Joseph O'Connor, former bishop of Roman Catholic Archdiocese of New York and Bishop of Scranton
 Karen Ann Quinlan, key figure in right to die controversy
 William Henry Richmond, coal mine operator
 Martin F. Scanlon, U.S. Air Force general
 B. F. Skinner, behaviorist and author
 Mabel Cox Surdam, photographer
 Charles Sumner "Sum" Woolworth, retailer, philanthropist, co-founder of Woolworth
 Mel Ziegler, co-founder, The Republic of Tea and Banana Republic

In popular culture

The Harry Chapin song "30,000 Pounds of Bananas" is about an actual fatal 1965 accident in Scranton, where a driver hauling bananas lost control of his truck as it barreled down Moosic Street.

Blue Valentine was partially filmed in Scranton.

The film adaptation of the Pulitzer Prize for Drama and Tony Award winning play, That Championship Season, is set in and was filmed in Scranton.

The city is home to the Pennsylvania Paper & Supply Company, which was the inspiration for a branch of the fictional paper company Dunder Mifflin on NBC's series The Office. The Scranton branch is the setting for the majority of the show's episodes.

The city was the setting of the home of Roy Munson (portrayed by Woody Harrelson) in the 1996 American sports comedy Kingpin. The scenes were shot in Pittsburgh as a stand in for Scranton.

The city is imagined as a member of the class of interstellar Okies in James Blish's 1962 novel, A Life for the Stars, in which 2273 AD Scranton, equipped with a space drive, flies away and leaves an impoverished Earth behind.

In 2017, Scranton got national recognition from late night television host John Oliver when he made jokes about how infatuated Scranton community members were with the little train that runs during the weather reports on Scranton's ABC-affiliated TV station WNEP-TV. The train had been featured in multiple of their Talkback16 segments. After a follow-up segment, Oliver donated a train set to WNEP. It was too big for their backyard, so they donated it to The Electric City Trolley Museum.

Musician John Legend was the head of the music department and choir director of Scranton's Bethel AME Church from 1995-2004.

Lyricist Richard Bernhard Smith wrote the song, Winter Wonderland, while being treated at the West Mountain Sanitarium in Scranton for tuberculosis.

American singer, actress and television personality Cher lived in Scranton as a baby and spent time at a Catholic orphanage in the city run by the Sisters of Mercy. Cher wrote about the experience in the song, Sisters of Mercy.

American author and film & television producer, Dick Wolf, was married to Susan Scranton, daughter of former Governor William Scranton, from 1970-1983.

Sister cities
Scranton has the following official sister cities: 
  Naga, Camarines Sur, Philippines
  Ballina, County Mayo, Connacht, Ireland
  Guardia Lombardi, Campania, Italy
  Balakovo, Saratov Oblast, Russia
  Trnava, Trnava Region, Slovakia
  Perugia, Umbria, Italy
  San Marino, San Marino
  Caronia, Sicily, Italy
  Little Rock, Arkansas, United States

See also

 Farley's Eatery and Pub
 The Office
 Polish Cathedral style
 Scranton Army Ammunition Plant
 USS Scranton, 4 ships
 Weston Field

Notes

References

External links

 City of Scranton

 
1778 establishments in Pennsylvania
Cities in Lackawanna County, Pennsylvania
Cities in Pennsylvania
County seats in Pennsylvania
Lackawanna Heritage Valley
Municipalities of the Anthracite Coal Region of Pennsylvania
Populated places established in 1778